Idil Ibrahim is a Somali-American independent film director, producer, actress, writer.

Personal life
Ibrahim earned a Bachelor of Arts in 2002 from the University of California, Berkeley. In her senior year at the institution, she was selected as an Episodic Series Intern for the competitive Academy of Television Arts and Sciences (ATAS) Internship program. She was also chosen as an Arts Bridge Scholar for UC Berkeley's Consortium for the Arts. While at Berkeley for undergrad, she was selected for the prestigious Academy of Television Arts and Sciences (ATAS) internship in the Episodic Series category and is now an alumnus of the program. During her time as an Arts Bridge Scholar, Ibrahim taught documentary film analysis and film production to Berkeley High School students. Ibrahim attended graduate studies at New York University, having won a Nadine Abergel Arts Fellowship.

Ibrahim was the girlfriend of combat photojournalist Tim Hetherington until he was killed while on assignment in Misrata, Libya during the 2011 Libyan civil war. U.S. Senator John McCain sent two American flags to Hetherington's memorial service in New York, one of which was presented to Ibrahim by members of the 173rd Airborne Brigade who had served under combat with Hetherington and writer Sebastian Junger on a multitude of occasions.

She presently resides in New York, and frequently travels around the world on various film projects.

Career
She is an alumna of the University of California, Berkeley, and attended NYU for graduate school.

Idil has worked on and produced award-winning film projects filmed in Cuba, Serbia, Japan, Turkey, Somalia, Lebanon, Zambia, Kenya, Senegal and Uganda. Idil produced the film Homecoming by Jim Chuchu, alongside Wanuri Kahiu, as part of the African Metropolis Program: 7 Directors, 7 Cities, supported by the Rotterdam Film Festival Hubert Bals Fund and the South African Goethe Institute, selected as part Contemporary World Cinema category at the 2013 Toronto International Film Festival. Idil also produced and directed the 4 part 'Behind the Scenes' documentary of Fishing Without Nets for VICE which was filmed in Kenya based on the feature film Fishing Without Nets which won the best directing award in the U.S. Dramatic Category at the 2014 Sundance Film Festival. As an actress, she played the female lead in Fishing Without Nets. In 2014, Idil had two projects at the Sundance Film Festival. In addition to her involvement with the feature Fishing Without Nets, she also produced the experimental documentary Am I Going Too Fast?, filmed in Kenya and directed by Hank Willis Thomas and Christopher Myers. Am I Going Too Fast? was part of the Sundance Global Film Challenge supported by the Bill & Melinda Gates Foundation.

In 2008, Ibrahim served as an Associate Producer on the feature documentary Americana. Directed by Topaz Adizes (City, Seven Miles Alone) and produced by Corinne Golden Weber (Babel, 21 Grams, Revolutionary Road), it was an official selection of the 2009 Cinéma du Réel festival at the Centre Georges Pompidou in Paris.[2][9] The work was also selected for the Margaret Mead International Documentary Film Festival and the Dallas AFI Film Festival.[2]Idil also served as an Associate Producer on the film Laredo, Texas, which was also an official selection of the 2010 Sundance Film Festival. She was one of the producers on the film Trece Años shot in Cuba selected for the 2009 Sundance Film Festival, the Aspen Shortsfest, GenArt, Los Angeles International, and Ashland Independent Film Festivals. Trece Años was also featured at Pangaea Day, a global multimedia event simultaneously aired and broadcast in locations around the globe such as Kigali, Cairo, London, Rio de Janeiro, and New York with the mission and purpose to decrease divisions and create change and global unity through the power of film.

Ibrahim was one of the Directors selected by Glamour Magazine and The Girl Project to film a short on one girl's education in Malawi. She was featured on Glamour Magazine's website in an article written by Shay Maunz titled "A Conversation with Filmmaker, Activist, and Badass Woman Idil Ibrahim".
Idil was selected by Instagram to be featured on the Instagrams Blog. Also, she was invited by the Honolulu Museum of Art in June 2017 for the screening of Fishing Without Nets, which is part of the Seventh Art Stand Film Series.

Idil directed and produced with Dylan Verrechia the short film Sega, starring Alassane Sy (Restless City, Mediterranea), which examines the issue of migration and repatriation. Sega was an official selection of the 25th Annual New York African Film Festival in conjunction with Film Society of Lincoln Center, Brooklyn Academy of Music and Maysles Cinema. Idil is passionate about human rights, humanitarian issues, global education and social issues and is proud of her work with Cell-ED, Gobee Group, and the International Rescue Committee, as well as past participation with UNHCR for World Refugee Day in Kakuma Refugee Camp. In 2018, Idil was selected as an International Jury Member by the International Organization for Migration and United Nations Association of Civilizations for the joint initiative of Plural Plus Global Youth Festival, a festival on migration, diversity and social inclusion.

Ibrahim was one of the Directors selected by Glamour Magazine and The Girl Project to film a short on one girl's education in Malawi. She was featured's on Glamour Magazine'''s website in an article written by Shay Maunz titled "A Conversation with Filmmaker, Activist, and Badass Woman Idil Ibrahim".

Idil was selected by Instagram to be featured on the Instagrams Blog.
Also, she was invited by the Honolulu Museum of Art in June 2017 for the screening of Fishing Without Nets which is part of the Seventh Art Stand Film Series.

During her time as an Arts Bridge Scholar, Ibrahim taught documentary film analysis and film production to Berkeley High School students.
Additionally, she co-hosted dinners with Purpose dinners to welcome refugees in response to Trump's Travel Ban of 2017, Fusion featured her in their video.

Idil is an alumnus of Tribeca All Access, an initiative the Tribeca Film Institute in conjunction with Tribeca Film Festival.

As an actress, Ibrahim has performed in independent cinema, commercial work, and off-off Broadway theater productions.

FilmographyAmericana (2008)Trece años (2009)Laredo, Texas (2010)Homecoming (2013)Transit Game (2014)
Fishing without Nets (2014)Sega'' (2018)

References

External links

Living people
Ethnic Somali people
American actresses
Somalian actresses
Somalian writers
Somalian emigrants to the United States
University of California, Berkeley alumni
New York University alumni
Year of birth missing (living people)
21st-century American women